Jafar Quli is a male given name built from quli.

People
 Jafarqoli Khan
 Jafar Qoli Khan Donboli
 Jafargulu agha Javanshir
 Jafargulu Khan Nakhchivanski
 Jafargulu Bakikhanov

See also
 Jafarguliyev